Groupe TVA Inc. is a Canadian communications company with operations in broadcasting, publishing and production. It was founded as Télé-Métropole Corporation in 1960, and owned CFTM-TV, Montreal's first privately-owned francophone station. It changed its legal name to Groupe TVA inc. on February 17, 1998.Quebecor Media holds voting control of the company through near-complete control of Groupe TVA's Class A shares; only the non-voting Class B shares are currently publicly traded.

Groupe TVA owns and operates the TVA network, the largest private French language television network in Canada and the most watched television network in Quebec. It also operates seven specialty channels, available via subscription television across Canada, and a motion picture division. TVA and its specialty channels have a 69% share of revenue in the French speaking market. The total value of the private Francophone sector is $491 million of which $349 million goes to TVA.

Revenue

Conventional television

 TVA
 CFTM-DT Montreal
 CFCM-DT Quebec City
 CFER-DT Rimouski
 CHLT-DT Sherbrooke
 CHEM-DT Trois-Rivières
 CJPM-DT Saguenay
 CKXT-DT Toronto (defunct)

Specialty television

As of 2015, all of Groupe TVA's specialty television assets are French-language as a result of the shutdown of the English-language Sun News Network.

Current
 addikTV - film and television series
 Évasion - travel and adventure 
 Canal Indigo - PPV movie service
 Le Canal Nouvelles - 24 hour news
 CASA - lifestyle and real estate
 MOI ET CIE - lifestyle and entertainment
 Prise 2 - retro film and television series
 TVA Sports - sports
 Yoopa - children's (pre-school) programs
 Zeste - food-related entertainment and lifestyle programming

Former
 Argent - business and financial news (channel ceased operations April 30, 2016)
 The Cave - men lifestyle (51% as managing partner and channel sold to Shaw Media on April 25, 2012)
 Sun News Network - news and opinion (51% as managing partner and channel ceased operations February 13, 2015)
 Télé Achats - infomercials (channel ceased operations August 1, 2012)

Other assets
 TVA Films (Film production and distributor)
 TVA Productions (Television production)
 TVA Publishing (magazine publisher, distributes over 70 titles)
 Télé Inter-Rives (Independent broadcaster, owns 45% stake)

See also
 Quebecor Media

References

External links
 Official website
 CRTC chart of Groupe TVA's assets (PDF)

Companies listed on the Toronto Stock Exchange
Quebecor
Magazine publishing companies of Canada
Mass media companies established in 1960
Television broadcasting companies of Canada
Companies based in Montreal